Hubert Charles Bath (6 November 188324 April 1945) was an English film composer, music director, and conductor.  His credits include the music to the Oscar-winning documentary Wings Over Everest (1934), as well as to the films Tudor Rose (1936), A Yank at Oxford (1938) and Love Story (1944).

Biography 
Bath was born in Barnstaple, Devon in 1883. He sang in the local church choir and in 1899 attended the Royal Academy of Music, studying piano with Oscar Beringer and composition with Frederick Corder. In 1913-14 he conducted Thomas Quinlan's opera troupe on its world tour, also acting as chorus master. He conducted "Madame Butterfly" at the London Opera House in July 1915, in a performance that starred Tamaki Miura.  After that he established himself as a composer of light operas, including Young England (Birmingham, 1915) and  Bubbole (Milan, 1920), extending the genre towards grand opera with Trilby.  He went on to compose many film scores (including part of the soundtrack of Alfred Hitchcock's Blackmail in 1929), marches for brass bands, orchestral suites, theatre music and choral works.

His composition Out of the Blue has been used as the theme music of Sports Report since the programme started in 1948.  Also well-known is his Cornish Rhapsody, written for, and essential to the plot of, the 1944 film Love Story.  Humorous cantatas such as The Wedding of Shon Maclean (1909), Look at the Clock (1910) and The Wake of O'Connor (1914) were popular with choral societies in their day. There are also many suites of character pieces for piano, including Shakespeare Pieces (1916), My Lady (1923), the Italian Suite (1924), the Gaelic Suite (five Irish sketches for piano), published in 1927, and the Sonnet Suite (1933).

In 1924, Bath was named as co-respondent in the divorce case between Colonel Alfred Rawlinson and the actress Jean Aylwin.

Bath died in Harefield, Middlesex in 1945, aged 61. His son John Bath (1915–2004) was also a film composer.

Selected filmography
 Under the Greenwood Tree (1929)
 The Informer (1929)
 The Plaything (1929)
 Tell England (1931)
 Evensong (1934 - uncredited)
 Wings Over Everest (1934)
 His Lordship (1936)
 The Luck of the Irish (1936)
Tudor Rose (1936)
 Non-Stop New York (1937)
 The Great Barrier (1937)
A Yank at Oxford (1938)
Dear Octopus (1943)
 Love Story (1944)

Notes

External links
 
 
 
 

1883 births
1945 deaths
English film score composers
English male film score composers
Musicians from Barnstaple
20th-century British male musicians